According to John Skylitzes, Sfengus or Sphengos was a brother of Knyaz Vladimir I of Kiev. Sfengus was a leader in the joint Byzantine-Kievan campaign to depose Georgius Tzul, the last recorded khagan of the Khazars.

Though identified as a brother of Vladimir I of Kiev, some historians such as Simon Franklin and Jonathan Shepard hypothesize that he is identical with Mstislav of Tmutarakan, Vladimir's son.

Sources
Franklin, Simon and Jonathan Shepard. The Emergence of Rus 750-1200. Longman, 1996.

Khazar military history
11th-century princes in Kievan Rus'